Harold Frederick Hansen (November 30, 1894 – June 23, 1977) was an American football and basketball coach.

Early coaching positions
Hansen served as the head football coach at the University of St. Thomas (1918) and Hamline University (1919–1920), both in St. Paul, Minnesota.

Georgia Tech
Hansen spent two seasons as the head men's basketball coach at Georgia Tech from 1924 to 1926, where he was also an assistant backfield coach for the Yellow Jackets football team.

Professional football coaching
Hansen coached the 1926 Newark Demons of the short-lived American Football League. This led to his hiring at the head coach of the Staten Island Stapletons, first an independent team (1927–1929) and later of the National Football League (1932).

References

1894 births
1977 deaths
American football halfbacks
Basketball coaches from Minnesota
Georgia Tech Yellow Jackets football coaches
Georgia Tech Yellow Jackets men's basketball coaches
Hamline Pipers football coaches
Minnesota Golden Gophers football coaches
Minnesota Golden Gophers football players
Players of American football from Minneapolis
Sports coaches from Minneapolis
St. Thomas (Minnesota) Tommies football coaches
Staten Island Stapletons coaches